Ali Beyk (also Romanized as ‘Alī Beyk and ‘Alī Beyg) is a village in Sahra Rural District, Anabad District, Bardaskan County, Razavi Khorasan Province, Iran. At the 2006 census, its population was 149, in 37 families.

References 

Populated places in Bardaskan County